Alla Konstantinovna Tarasova (– 5 April 1973) was a Soviet and Russian stage and film actress and pedagogue. She was a leading actress of Konstantin Stanislavski's Moscow Art Theatre from the late 1920s onward. People's Artist of the USSR (1937) and Hero of Socialist Labour (1973).

Career
A title role in Anna Karenina (1937) was her most resounding success. She appeared to mixed reviews as Katerina in the screen version of Ostrovsky's The Storm (1934) and as Catherine I in the movie Peter the Great (1937). Tarasova toured London and United States with the Moscow Art Theatre in 1922–1924 to much international acclaim. She was a recipient of five Stalin Prizes (in 1941, twice in 1946, 1947, and 1949), two Orders of Lenin and the honorary title of People's Artist of the USSR in 1937.

Tarasova joined the Communist Party in 1954, having already been elected to the Supreme Soviet of the Soviet Union in 1952. She served as a deputy of the Supreme Soviet until 1960 and was awarded the title of Hero of Socialist Labour shortly before her death in 1973.

Tarasova died on 5 April 1973 and was interred at the Vvedenskoye Cemetery.

In 1975, a ship, the MV Alla Tarasova, was named after her.

Filmography
 Raskolnikow (1923)
 The Storm (1933)
 Peter the Great (1937)
 Guilty Without Guilt (1945)
 Anna Karenina (1953) 
 A Long Happy Life (1966)

References

Sources
 Solovyova, Inna. 1999. "The Theatre and Socialist Realism, 1929-1953." Trans. Jean Benedetti. In A History of Russian Theatre. Ed. Robert Leach and Victor Borovsky. Cambridge: Cambridge UP. 325–357. .

External links

1898 births
1973 deaths
20th-century Russian actresses
Actors from Kyiv
Communist Party of the Soviet Union members
Moscow Art Theatre
Academic staff of Moscow Art Theatre School
Third convocation members of the Supreme Soviet of the Soviet Union
Fourth convocation members of the Supreme Soviet of the Soviet Union
Fifth convocation members of the Supreme Soviet of the Soviet Union
Heroes of Socialist Labour
Honored Artists of the RSFSR
People's Artists of the USSR
Stalin Prize winners
Recipients of the Order of Lenin
Recipients of the Order of the Red Banner of Labour
Actresses from the Russian Empire
Russian drama teachers
Russian film actresses
Russian stage actresses
Soviet drama teachers
Soviet film actresses
Soviet stage actresses
Burials at Vvedenskoye Cemetery